Louis Boyer (13 November 1921 – 12 May 2017) was a French physician and politician. He served as a member of the French Senate from 1974 to 2001, representing Loiret. He was also the mayor of Gien from 1959 to 1995.

References

1921 births
2017 deaths
People from Loiret
20th-century French physicians
21st-century French physicians
French Senators of the Fifth Republic
Mayors of places in Centre-Val de Loire
Senators of Loiret